The Second Battle of Kut was fought on 23 February 1917, between British and Ottoman forces at Kut, Mesopotamia (present-day Iraq).

The battle was part of the British advance to Baghdad begun in December 1916 by a 50,000-man British force (mainly from British India) organised in two army corps.

The British, led by Frederick Stanley Maude, recaptured the city, but the Ottoman garrison there did not get trapped inside (as had happened to Townshend's troops in the previous year when the Ottomans had besieged Kut in the siege of Kut): the Ottoman commander, Kâzım Karabekir Bey, managed a good-order retreat from the town of his remaining soldiers (about 2,500), pursued by a British fluvial flotilla along the Tigris River.

The British advance wore off on 27 February at Aziziyeh, some  beyond Kut. After three days' worth of supplies had been accumulated, Maude continued his march toward Baghdad.

See also

Siege of Kut

References

External links
 Second Battle of Kut

1917 in Ottoman Iraq
Battles of the Mesopotamian campaign
Battles of World War I involving the Ottoman Empire
Battles of World War I involving the United Kingdom
Battles of World War I involving British India
Conflicts in 1917
Kut
February 1917 events